Ibrayevo (İbray) is a rural locality (a selo) and the administrative centre of Ibrayevsky Selsoviet, Kiginsky District, Bashkortostan, Russia. The population was 471 as of 2010. There are 6 streets.

Geography 
Ibrayevo is located 14 km southwest of Verkhniye Kigi (the district's administrative centre) by road. Yukalikulevo is the nearest rural locality.

References 

Rural localities in Kiginsky District